Benezeri Kisembo was an Anglican bishop in Uganda: he served as the Bishop of Rwenzori until 2009.

References

21st-century Anglican bishops in Uganda
Anglican bishops of Rwenzori
Uganda Christian University alumni